Milford Dam can refer to:

Milford Dam (Kansas)
Milford Dam (Maine)

See also
 Milford (disambiguation)